The 2017 Idol Star Athletics Archery Rhythmic Gymnastics Aerobics Championships was held at Goyang Gymnasium in Goyang, South Korea on January 16, 2017 and was broadcast on MBC on January 30, 2017 at 17:15 (KST) for two episodes.

Cast

Presenters
Jun Hyun-moo, Jung Eun-ji and Lee Soo-geun hosted the show.

Main
Members of male K-pop groups:
Astro, B.A.P, B1A4, BTS, EXO, Imfact, KNK, Madtown, Monsta X, NCT 127, NU'EST, Seventeen, SF9, Snuper, Teen Top, UP10TION, Victon, VIXX
Members of female K-pop groups:
AOA, Berry Good, Brave Girls, Cosmic Girls, EXID, Fiestar, GFriend, Gugudan, Hello Venus, Heyne, Laboum, Lovelyz, Melody Day, Oh My Girl, Red Velvet, Rui (H.U.B), Sonamoo, Twice

Synopsis
The episode features male and female K-pop entertainers, which competes in various sports competitions. At the championships, a total of eight events (four in athletics, two in archery, one in rhythmic gymnastics and one in aerobics) were contested: four by men and four by women. There were 194 K-pop idols participating, divided into 38 teams follow their music groups.

Results

Men

Athletics

Aerobics

Archery

Women

Athletics

Rhythmic gymnastics

Archery

Ratings

References

External links

MBC TV original programming
South Korean variety television shows
South Korean game shows
2017 in South Korean television
Idol Star Athletics Championships